This is list of springs of Estonia. The list is incomplete.

See also
List of springs

References 

Springs
 
Estonia